Time Gentlemen, Please! is a 1952 British comedy film directed by Lewis Gilbert and starring Eddie Byrne, Jane Barrett and Raymond Lovell. It was produced by Group 3 Films with funding from the NFFC and distributed by ABPC. It was shot at Southall Studios and on location at Thaxted in Essex. The film's sets were designed by the art director Michael Stringer. The film is based on the 1946 novel 	Nothing to Lose by R.J. Minney.

Apart from occasional scene location within the bar (not critical to the plot) the title of the film (a phrase used at closing time in British bars) is not explained.

Plot
The Ministry of Industrial Co-ordination is making a study of employment rates in British towns. The top will receive a visit from the Prime Minister. They are surprised that the best, allegedly at 99.9%, is Little Hayhoe, a small town in Essex with a population of 2,000 and only one unemployed.

The missing "0.1%" is Irishman Daniel "Dan" Dance, who is a homeless person but well-liked by most of the residents. The village council, however, are eager to put him out of the way before the Prime Minister arrives. When Dan leaves the pub without paying his bill, the landlord and councillor Eric Hace reports Dan to the village's only policeman, Police Constable Tumball, who arrests Dan. Sir Digby Montague, the head of the council and one of the local magistrates, plans to sentence him to a week in gaol.

When Sir Digby finds that his maid Sally, who is Dan's granddaughter, has been giving Dan Sir Digby's leftovers for dinner regularly, he promptly sacks her. The official reason that all get in trouble is theft of a fork.

Miss Mouncey, another councillor, comes up with the idea that Dan should be sent to live in one of the almshouses, which have been empty for 50 years. Vicar Reverend Simpson informs the Crouches, the custodians, that the regulations are to be strictly enforced, even though they are 400 years old. Among other things, the rules dictate that he be washed by the matron every night and wear a uniform  in the manner of a Chelsea Pensioner. When Dan returns drunk the next night, he is put in stocks. Displeased by this, the villagers pelt Timothy Crouch with food, rather than pelt Dan as the councillor intended.

Bill Jordan, who is sympathetic to Dan's plight and attracted to Sally, reminds the councillors that an election will be held before the Prime Minister's visit.

When the vicar dies, he is replaced by the Reverend Soater, a much more lenient man and an Irishman himself. Soater examines the rules (written in Latin) to see if he can do anything to help his countryman. He discovers that the rents for the extensive lands indicated on a map are supposed to go to the upkeep of the almshouses, with any remainder distributed between the inmates daily. He estimates that the rents amount to almost £7,000 per annum. Dan, as the only inmate, is entitled to £20 a day. After consulting a lawyer the next day, Soater gives Dan £20, plus the arrears from when Soater arrived. The news spreads quickly and Dan treats everyone to drinks and gifts.

To get Dan to leave the almshouse, Sir Digby offers him a very easy job, though with a much smaller salary. When Dan refuses, Hace schemes to make Dan late for the daily 9.00pm closing of the almshouse gates, which would disqualify him, enlisting Miss Mouncey to help distract Dan, but Dan gets Miss Mouncey drunk and she blurts out the plot. Dan rushes back to the almshouse just in time.

Bill Jordan goes out on a date with Peggy Stebbins and, at her insistence, kisses her. Then he quickly drives over to Sally's lodgings and, without a word, kisses her, but when he admits Peggy put the idea into his head, Sally becomes annoyed and slams the door on him.

With the council elections coming up, Mr. Spink, who owns the local factory, suggests that Dan run for office. Dan is uninterested at first, but soon decides he will, and he is joined by Bill Jordan, Spink and Mary Wade, the shopkeeper who now employs Sally. Hace comes up with a scheme to make Dan look foolish by recruiting 11 tramps for the almshouse, but Soater cites a regulation that the additions must be approved by the residents, and Dan rejects them.

The new candidates are all elected, displacing the previous councillors. Sally is overjoyed and kisses Bill. Dan rushes back to the almshouse at 9.00, where he exacts revenge on the Crouches and then heads back to the festivities. He announces that now that he has disqualified himself, the money can go to more worthy causes and the almshouses will be converted to a day nursery for the workers' children. Spink offers Dan a job suitable to his talents: mattress tester. With that, Little Hayhoe reaches its goal of 100% employment and welcomes the visit of the Prime Minister.

Cast

 Eddie Byrne as Dan Dance
 Jane Barrett as Sally
 Robert Brown as Bill Jordan
 Raymond Lovell as Sir Digby Montague
 Sidney James as the pub landlord, Eric Hace
 Marjorie Rhodes as Miss Mouncey
 Hermione Baddeley as Emma Stebbins
 Dora Bryan as Peggy Stebbins
 Thora Hird as Alice Crouch
 Ivor Barnard as Timothy Crouch
 Edie Martin as Mary Wade
 Sydney Tafler as Joseph Spink
 Joan Young as Mrs. Round
 Marianne Stone as Mrs. Pincer
 Patrick McAlinney as Rev. Soater
 Julian D'Albie as George Burton
 Nigel Clarke as Rev. Simpson
 Henry Longhurst as P.C. Tumball
 Peter Jones as Lionel Batts
 Peter Swanwick as Jeremiah Higgins
 Thomas Gallagher as Bob Cannon
 Freda Bamford as Mabel
 Ian Carmichael as P.R.O. (Public Relations Officer for the Prime Minister)
 Brian Roper as Cyril
 Harry Herbert as Tramp
 Jack May as Man with Ear-trumpet
 Toke Townley as Potman
 Tristan Rawson as Dr. Hawkes
 Donovan Winter as Hairdresser
 Sheila Aza as Manicurist
 Julie Milton as Manor House Maid
 Michael Edmonds as Freckles
 Cora Bennett as P.R.O.'s Secretary
 Audrey Noble as Spink's Secretary
 Virginia Winter as Vicarage Maid
 Neil Gemmell as Heckler
 Helen Boursnell as P.C. Tumball's little girl

Production
It was the third film from Group 3 Films and was shot under the title Nothing to Lose. John Grierson head of Group 3 said it was "gentle nose thumbing" and hoped it could be as good as The Digger's Daughter or The Baker's Wife.

Home media
In 2007, Time Gentlemen, Please! was given a DVD release as part of the Long Lost Comedy Classics collection.

Critical reception
The film historians Steve Chibnall and Brian McFarlane regard Time Gentlemen, Please! as one of "the most attractive British 'B' films, noting that "it has the advantage of an amusing screenplay ... a central character engaging enough in concept and execution to hold the narrative together, and one of those prodigally rich casts of British character actors ... which can make much worse films than this enjoyable".

References

External links
 
 
 
 

1952 films
1952 comedy films
British black-and-white films
British comedy films
Films directed by Lewis Gilbert
Films produced by Herbert Mason
Films scored by Antony Hopkins
Films set in Essex
Films shot in Essex
Films shot at Southall Studios
Films based on British novels
1953 comedy films
1953 films
1950s English-language films
1950s British films